Many songs are used to express and love of Brazilians for football and commemorate the country's victories into the FIFA World Cup. Though foreign fans and broadcasters usually play Aquarela do Brasil in Brazilian matches, these are rarely associated with the game in Brazil.

Canal 100 Tune 
Perhaps the most popular melody associated to football in Brazil is Na Cadência do Samba, widely known as Que bonito é ("How beautiful it is"), which served as the theme tune for Canal 100, a newsreel (cinejornal) running in local theaters from 1962 up to early 1980s. It is a soft samba composed and written by Luis Bandeira, famous for his frevo compositions for Carnival in Pernambuco. Although it had lyrics, the song was used by the newsreel producer Carlos Niemeyer in a purely instrumental version, orchestrated with trumpets and piano. More can be seen (and heard) at the newsreel website.

A Taça do Mundo é Nossa 
A Taça do Mundo é Nossa ("The World Cup is Ours") was introduced in 1958 after Brazil won its first World Cup title. It was composed by Maugeri, Müller, Sobrinho e Dagô.

The music was re-recorded in 1962,after Brazil won the World Cup in that year, with the lyrics of the last verse being modified to
"O brasileiro/desta vez no Chile/mostrou o futebol como é que é/ganhou o Bicampeonato/Sambando com a bola no pé/Goool!" (The Brazilian this time in Chile/Showed football the way it is/Won the Bichampionship/Dancing the samba with the ball on the feet/Goal!)

Pra Frente Brasil 
Forward, Brazil introduced in 1970 during the FIFA World Cup 1970 this is widely and most recognized song and marks the Pelé and the Seleção Canarinho era. Composed by Miguel Gustavo and used in the film of the same name, which is a harsh criticism of the military dictatorship's usage of football to alienate people in regard to the horrors of political repression.

Coração Verde e Amarelo 
Green and Yellow Heart was introduced by Rede Globo for the World Cup 1994 and is used until today by the channel. It had previously been released for the national championship of 1993, with different lyrics. The melody are used each time Brazil makes a goal and is the official for football broadcasts including Campeonato Brasileiro.

The song was updated in 1998 for the fifth title campaign: the line "É taça na raça, Brasil!" was changed to "Tenta que é penta, Brasil!" (Try and win the fifth title, Brazil!). The theme was used again in 2002, but slightly modified due to the loss in 1998. In 2006, Rede Globo did not use the lyrics anymore, but only an instrumental version of the same song.

Papa Essa Brasil (Take this one, Brazil) was the Rede Globo World Cup 1990 song, but it was abandoned later.

Eu Sou Brasileiro 
I am Brazilian, introduced in an Ambev SKOL beer TV commercial in late 1990s and used mainly in World Cup 2002.

The song can be sung in regular matches of the Campeonato Brasileiro and in games of other popular sports of Brazil such as Volleyball and Basketball. It became popular around the 1998 World Cup.

Football songs and chants
Songs

Football songs